Joonas Lehtivuori (born July 19, 1988) is a Finnish professional ice hockey defenceman. He is currently playing for Adler Mannheim of the Deutsche Eishockey Liga (DEL). Lehtivuori was selected by the Philadelphia Flyers in the 4th round (101st overall) of the 2006 NHL Entry Draft.

Playing career
Lehtivuori began his professional career with Ilves. He left Ilves on April 27, 2009 and joined the National Hockey League (NHL) club Philadelphia Flyers.

Lehtivuori did not play any games for the Philadelphia Flyers organization in the 2008–09 season. However, in the 2009–10 season, Lehtivuori was assigned to the Adirondack Phantoms, the Flyers' relocated team affiliate, of the American Hockey League (AHL). Playing in 66 games, he scored 5 goals and 23 points. Halfway through his second season with the Phantoms, Lehtivuori was loaned out to KalPa of the SM-liiga. On August 18, 2011, Lehtivuori signed a one-week try-out contract with the Modo Hockey of the Elitserien (SEL).

Lehtivuori played three seasons with HPK in the Liiga, before opting to leave as a free agent to sign a two-year contract with German outfit, Adler Mannheim of the DEL, on April 13, 2018.

Career statistics

Regular season and playoffs

International

Awards and honours

References

External links
 

1988 births
Living people
Adirondack Phantoms players
Adler Mannheim players
Finnish ice hockey defencemen
HPK players
Ilves players
KalPa players
Modo Hockey players
Philadelphia Flyers draft picks
Ice hockey people from Tampere